Sheikh Muhammad Akram is a Pakistani politician who had been a member of the National Assembly of Pakistan, from June 2013 to May 2018.

Political career
He was elected to the National Assembly of Pakistan as a candidate of Pakistan Muslim League (N) from Constituency NA-89 (Jhang-I) in 2013 Pakistani general election. He received 75,053 votes and defeated Muhammad Ahmed Ludhianvi. In 2014, he was disqualified and unseated by an election tribunal however in 2016,  the Supreme Court of Pakistan declared Akram as returned candidate.

References

Living people
Pakistan Muslim League (N) politicians
Punjabi people
Pakistani MNAs 2013–2018
Year of birth missing (living people)